Cotulla–La Salle County Airport  is a public use airport located one nautical mile (1.85 km) northeast of the central business district of Cotulla, a city in La Salle County, Texas, United States. It is owned by the City of Cotulla and La Salle County. According to the FAA's National Plan of Integrated Airport Systems for 2009–2013, it is categorized as a general aviation facility.

Facilities and aircraft 
It has one runway designated 13/31 with an asphalt surface measuring 5,005 by 75 feet (1,526 x 23 m).

For the 12-month period ending December 31, 2008, the airport had 7,900 aircraft operations, an average of 21 per day: 70% general aviation, 25% military, and 5% air taxi. At that time there were 9 aircraft based at this airport: 33.3% single-engine, 11.1% multi-engine and 55.6% helicopter.

References

External links 
 Cotulla–La Salle County (COT) at Texas DOT Airport Directory
 Page Aviation, the fixed-base operator (FBO)
 Aerial image as of 21 February 2002 from USGS The National Map
 

Airports in Texas
Buildings and structures in La Salle County, Texas
Transportation in La Salle County, Texas